BPR Bank Rwanda PLC (BPR PLC), formerly Banque Populaire du Rwanda SA, is a commercial bank in Rwanda. The bank is licensed by the National Bank of Rwanda, the central bank and national banking regulator.

Overview
BPR is a retail (consumer) bank, offering products that include current and savings accounts, debit and credit cards, mortgages and loans. The bank offers consumer banking tools like mobile banking, as well as agricultural business expertise to corporate customers in the food and agri-business value chain.

, BPR Bank Rwanda Plc was a large financial services provider in Rwanda. Its total asset valuation was RWF:648 billion (US$642 million), with 154 networked branches.

In 2016, BPR employed about 1,400 staff at that time.  However, following the acquisition by Atlas Mara, and the merger with BRD Commercial, about 300 people were terminated.

In 2021, KCB Group successfully completed the acquisition of Banque Populaire du Rwanda Plc (BPR) from Atlas Mara Mauritius Limited and Arise B.V. In 2022, in line with its strategy for expansion and enhanced financial inclusion across the region, KCB Group successfully amalgamated Banque Populaire du Rwanda and KCB Bank Rwanda Plc to form BPR Bank Rwanda Plc. The success of this merger makes BPR Bank Rwanda Plc the second largest bank in the Rwanda banking industry. It is reported that KCB Group spent about KSh:6.3 billion (approx. US$55 million) in the acquisition process.

History
The origins of the bank can be traced back to 1975, when the first Banque Populaire du Rwanda was formed in the settlement of Nkamba, in the city of Kibungo, Eastern Province. Over the next ten years, many other similar banks were founded around the country. In 1986, the various autonomous Banques Populaires formed an umbrella called the Union des Banques Populaires du Rwanda (UBPR). UBPR was operated as a cooperative bank.

In January 2008, following 33 years of experience in the Rwandan financial sector, UBPR was transformed from a cooperative bank into a commercial bank: Banque Populaire du Rwanda S.A. In June 2008, Rabobank, the Dutch cooperative banking conglomerate, acquired 35 percent of the shares in BPR. In July 2012, Visa Inc. certified the bank to issue visa-branded debit and credit cards.

In January 2016, Atlas Mara completed its acquisition of a controlling stake of BPR after acquiring shares from existing shareholders and merging the bank with the commercial banking business that was spun off Rwanda Development Bank.

In April 2019, Equity Bank Group, the second largest banking conglomerate by assets in East Africa, unveiled plans to acquire 62 percent of Banque Populaire du Rwanda, in a share swap with the Atlas Mara Limited. Negotiations between Equity Group and Atlas Mara were terminated in July 2020 when the parties failed to reach agreement on the valuation of the transaction. The COVID-19 pandemic contributed to the complexity of the negotiations.

Ownership
 the bank's stock was owned by the following shareholders, as outlined in the table below:

Branch network
As of May 2022, BPR Bank Plc maintained a network of 154 full-service branches, and over 100 ATMs in all Regions of Rwanda.

Governance
The activities of BPR Bank Plc are supervised by a seven-member board of directors representing commercial activities, operations, risk and the branch network, headed by the CEO. The current chairman of the board is George Rubagumya. The day-to-day affairs of the bank are managed by a ten-member executive team, led by the CEO, George Odhiambo.

See also
 List of banks in Rwanda
 Economy of Rwanda

References

External links
 Presentation; on BPR mobile banking
 Atlas Mara Limited: Completion of BPR Acquisition As of 7 January 2016.

Banks of Rwanda
Banks established in 1975
1975 establishments in Rwanda
Organisations based in Kigali
Economy of Kigali